Annette Holmberg-Jansson (born 1969) is a politician and restaurant manager who has been a Member of the Parliament of Åland since 2011 and leads the Moderate Coalition for Åland political party.

Life 
Holmberg-Jansson was born in 1969 in Stockholm to Swedish parents. At the age of one, she moved with her family to Åland. She is a restaurant manager and lives in Jomala.

She was elected a Member of the Parliament of Åland in 2011 and served on the Adjustment (2013–14) and Finance (2013–15) Committees during that four-year term. She was re-elected in 2015 to serve another four years and has been a member of the Social and Environmental Committee; she was vice-chairman of the Åland delegation in the Baltic Sea Parliamentary Conference. In November 2016, Holmberg-Jansson succeeded Johan Ehn as leader of the Moderate Coalition for Åland political party; at the party's autumn meeting, she received 30 votes compared to the contender, Marcus Clausen, who received ten (two other papers were spoilt).

References 

1969 births
Women from Åland in politics
Members of the Parliament of Åland
Politicians from Stockholm
People from Jomala
21st-century Finnish women politicians
Living people